The Final Curtain Tour was a concert tour by English musician Elton John which took place in North America in 2015.

Background
Elton John decided to wind down a 50-year career to focus on family.

Set list
This set list is representative of the performance on 3 October 2015 in Omaha, Nebraska, United States. It does not represent all concerts for the duration of the tour.

"Funeral for a Friend/Love Lies Bleeding"
"Bennie and the Jets"
"Candle in the Wind"
"All the Girls Love Alice"
"Levon"
"Tiny Dancer"
"Believe"
"Daniel"
"Philadelphia Freedom"
"Goodbye Yellow Brick Road"
"Rocket Man"
"Hey Ahab"
"I Guess That's Why They Call It the Blues"
"Mona Lisas and Mad Hatters"
"Your Song"
"Burn Down the Mission"
"Sad Songs (Say So Much)"
"Sorry Seems to Be the Hardest Word"
"Don't Let the Sun Go Down on Me"
"The Bitch Is Back"
"I'm Still Standing"
"Your Sister Can't Twist (But She Can Rock 'n Roll)"
"Saturday Night's Alright for Fighting"
Encore
"Crocodile Rock"

Tour dates
List of concerts, showing date, city, country, venue, tickets sold, number of available tickets and amount of gross revenue

Tour band
Elton John – Piano, vocals
Davey Johnstone – Guitar, banjo, backing vocals
Matt Bissonette – Bass guitar, backing vocals
Kim Bullard – Keyboards
Ray Cooper - Percussion
John Mahon – Percussion, backing vocals
Nigel Olsson – drums, backing vocals

Notes

External links
Elton John's official website

References

Elton John concert tours
2015 concert tours